Major General Thomas Oppong-Peprah is a Ghanaian military officer who is currently Chief of Army Staff of the Ghana Army. His appointment to the position by President Akuffo-Addo was announced on 12 February 2020 to take effect from 18 February 2020. He took over from William Azure Ayamdo.

Education 
He attended the University of Ghana where he completed with a Bachelor of Science degree in Administration with emphasis Human Resource Management. Oppong Peprah also holds a Post-Graduate certificate in Public Administration from Ghana Institute of Management and Public Administration (GIMPA).

References 

Chiefs of Army Staff (Ghana)
Living people
Year of birth missing (living people)